The Moorooka Ward is a Brisbane City Council ward covering Moorooka, Acacia Ridge, Archerfield, Coopers Plains, Nathan, Pallara, Rocklea, Salisbury, Willawong, and parts of Durack and Oxley.

Councillors for Moorooka Ward

Results

References 

City of Brisbane wards